Alton Bay is an unincorporated community in the town of Alton, New Hampshire, United States, and is located on Alton Bay, a  cove of Lake Winnipesaukee which forms the southernmost point on the lake. The village is part of the Lakes Region, a popular resort area of New Hampshire.

Route 11 is an east-west highway that crosses the entire state of New Hampshire, connecting Laconia to the west and Rochester to the east.

In 1851 the village became the terminus of the Cochecho Railroad from Dover, New Hampshire. The rail line became the Lake Shore Railroad in 1890, continuing west to Lakeport in Laconia. It was in operation until 1935. The MS Mount Washington and its predecessor ships on Lake Winnipesaukee have made Alton Bay a stop since 1872.

Alton Bay is home to the Alton Bay Christian Conference Center, a Christian retreat center and campground organized in 1863 (as the Second Advent Camp Meeting and incorporated as the Alton Bay Camp Meeting Association in 1876). It continues its year-round ministry by hosting retreat groups, summer camps, concerts, speakers, and summer residents (who live there and participate in the services of the Association).

The village has a separate ZIP code (03810) from the rest of the town of Alton.

References

Unincorporated communities in New Hampshire
Unincorporated communities in Belknap County, New Hampshire
Populated places on Lake Winnipesaukee
Alton, New Hampshire